Ton Verkerk (born 15 March 1955) is a retired Dutch football goalkeeper and later manager.

References

1955 births
Living people
Dutch footballers
FC Den Bosch players
K. Beringen F.C. players
Willem II (football club) players
Eredivisie players
Association football goalkeepers
Dutch expatriate footballers
Expatriate footballers in Belgium
Dutch expatriate sportspeople in Belgium
Dutch football managers
RKC Waalwijk non-playing staff
FC Aarau managers
Dutch expatriate football managers
Expatriate football managers in Switzerland
Dutch expatriate sportspeople in Switzerland